Silene caroliniana, the sticky catchfly or wild pink, is a spring flowering perennial forb with pink flowers, which is native to the Eastern United States. It is listed as an endangered species by the state of Florida. It is found growing in habitats such as dry rocky or sandy forests, barrens, and outcrops.

The corolla varies in color ranging from a dark pink to white. When in bloom they are visited by pollinators, like large bees, bee flies, and hawkmoths.

References

caroliniana
Flora of the Eastern United States